Paul Grimm (January 11, 1891 – 1974) was an artist born to German parents in South Africa. As a small child, he moved with his parents to the United States. He reportedly was seen as having artistic talent as a child and, as an adult, attended a university-level art school in New York. Between 1910 and 1920, he reportedly went to South America for a few years before returning stateside and settling in southern California.

Grimm gained much of his present-day fame by painting landscapes of southern California in the 1920s. Many works depict alluvial fans and desert vegetation in the eastern half of Riverside County. The San Jacinto Mountains appear frequently in his work. Most of the works are oil on canvas. To a viewer untrained in art, his work looks similar to desert landscapes of Karl Albert (1911 – 2007). A residence on Calle Palo Fierro in the Palm Springs Warm Sands Neighborhood was built for him in 1935. He had a studio on Palm Canyon Drive in Palm Springs from the 1950s until his death in 1974.

His work is held by Palm Springs Art Museum, Picerne Arizona Landmark Collection at the Desert Caballeros Western Museum (Wickenburg, Arizona), and the Irvine Museum.

Grimm's works have been part of numerous exhibitions at the Irvine.

Further reading
 Edan Milton Hughes, Artists in California, 1786-1940, Hughes Pub. Co.

References

External links
 Rear View – The Elusive Impressionist

American landscape painters
Painters from California
Artists from Palm Springs, California
1891 births
1974 deaths
20th-century American painters
American male painters
South African emigrants to the United States
20th-century American male artists